Richard Campbell (born 8 February 1982) is a British actor.

Career
He is best known for his comedic turn as local bully "Tyrone" in British film Anuvahood and his role of Ndale Kayuni in Waterloo Road.

Campbell has won a Screen Nation Award for his portrayal of Dominic Hardy in TV show The Bill.

His work has included Breathless, Mid Morning Matters with Alan Partridge, and recurring roles in The Silence and Channel 4 drama Top Boy. As a film actor, Campbell has appeared in Wilderness, The Plague, The Firm, Victim, Fast Girls, and Get Lucky. In addition, Campbell has done extensive work in West End theatre including, Dirty Butterfly at Young Vic Theatre, Lower Ninth at the Donmar Warehouse, Truth and Reconciliation at Royal Court Theatre and in 2013 playing Tom Robinson alongside Robert Sean Leonard as Atticus Fitch in To Kill A Mockingbird at Regents Park Open Air Theatre.

Filmography

Film

Television

Video games

References

External links

1983 births
Living people
Male actors from London
English male film actors
English male television actors
English male video game actors
English male voice actors
English people of Jamaican descent
Black British male actors
21st-century English male actors
People from Hackney, London